Dagfin Huseby (5 October 1922 – 24 February 2010) was a Norwegian wrestler. He competed in the men's Greco-Roman bantamweight at the 1952 Summer Olympics.

References

External links
 

1922 births
2010 deaths
Norwegian male sport wrestlers
Olympic wrestlers of Norway
Wrestlers at the 1952 Summer Olympics
People from Halden
Sportspeople from Viken (county)